Mubarak Shahi is a village of Mir Ali tehsil in Khyber Pakhtunkhwa, Pakistan.

Villages in Khyber Pakhtunkhwa